Sussex 3 (known as Sussex Oranjeboom Division 3 for sponsorship reasons) is an English level 11 Rugby Union League.  It is run by the Sussex Rugby Football Union and was originally for teams predominantly from West Sussex until a division reorganization for the 2016-17 meant that clubs from East Sussex would also take part.  Promoted teams move up to Sussex 2 while relegated teams drop down to either Sussex Asahi Division 4 East or Sussex Late Red Division 4 West depending on geography. Sussex Oranjeboom 2 West was introduced in 2010–11 and is the equivalent to former division Sussex 3 which had its last season in 2003–04.  It changed to its current name of Sussex Oranjeboom Division 3 in 2016–17.

Original teams
When league rugby began in 1987 this division contained the following teams:

Arun
Brighton Polytechnic
Ditchling
Sunallon
Midhurst
Newick
Pulborough
Robin Hood

Sussex 3 honours

Sussex 3 (1987–1992)

The original Sussex 3 was a tier 10 league with promotion up to Sussex 1 and there was no relegation down as it was the lowest level of the league system.  The division was cancelled at the end of the 1991–92 season.

Sussex 3 (1994-1996)

After an absence of two years, Sussex 3 was reintroduced for the 1994–95 season as a tier 11 league.  Promotion was to Sussex 2 and there was no relegation due to Sussex 3 being the lowest level in the league system.

Sussex 3 (1996-2000)

The cancellation of National 5 South at the end of the 1995–96 season meant that Sussex 3 reverted to being a tier 10 league.  Promotion continued to Sussex 2 and there was no relegation.  Sussex 3 was cancelled for the second time at the end of the 1999–00 season, with the majority of teams transferred into the new Sussex 2 East or Sussex 2 West (formerly a single Sussex 2 division).

Sussex 3 (2002-2004)

After an absence of two years, Sussex 3 returned for the 2002–03 season, now as a tier 11 league.  Promotion was to Sussex 2 and there was no relegation.  After just two seasons, Sussex 3 was cancelled for the third time in its history.

Sussex 2 East / Sussex 2 West (2010–2016)

Sussex 3 was reintroduced for the 2010–11 season in the form of two regional divisions - Sussex "Asahi" 2 East and Sussex "Oranjeboom" 2 West - both sitting at tier 11 of the league system.  Promotion was to Sussex Canterbury Jack Intermediate (renamed back to Sussex 2 for the 2015–16 season onward) and relegation to either Sussex 3 East or Sussex 3 West.

Sussex 3 (2016–onward)

For the 2016–17 season, Sussex 3 was remerged back into a single division at tier 11 of the league system.  Promotion was to Sussex 2 and relegation to Sussex 4.

Number of league titles

Ditchling (2)
Old Brightonian (2)
Rye (2)
Uckfield II (2)
BA Wingspan (1)
Barns Green (1)
Bognor II (1)
Chichester IHE (1)
East Grinstead III (1)
Eastbourne II (1)
Hellingly (1)
Horley (1)
Horsham II (1)
Midhurst (1)
Newick (1)
Plumpton (1)
Pulborough (1)
Pulborough II (1)
Shoreham (1)
Sunallon (1)
Sussex Police (1)

Notes

See also
London & SE Division RFU
Sussex RFU
English rugby union system
Rugby union in England

References

External links
Sussex Rugby

Rugby union leagues in England
Rugby union in Sussex